Back to Love is the eighth studio album by Filipino singer-actress Jolina Magdangal originally released by Star Music on 20 November 2015 through digital downloading and streaming containing seven original songs. An expanded edition was released in February 2016, this time both on digital and physical forms. The album serves as Magdangal's comeback album after a seven-year hiatus in the recording industry, as well as a homecoming in Star Music.

Two weeks after its release, it was certified with Gold from the Philippine Association of the Record Industry.

In the 8th PMPC Star Awards for Music, Magdangal won Best Female Recording Artist of the Year and Back To Love was nominated for Album of the Year and Best Album Cover.

Critical response
Back to Love received positive reviews from music critics with Rito P. Asilo of the Philippine Daily Inquirer generally praising the selections and Magdangal's delivery as "love songs that are as emotively arranged as they are lovingly rendered". In particular, Asilo lauds Magdangal's technical singing in the album's carrier single "Ikaw Ba 'Yon" saying "[it] is a love-on-the-rocks ditty that allows [Magdangal] to display her gorgeous notes as she scales the tune’s ascending melody. But, the songstress’ triumph goes beyond technical singing in this particular track, she effectively delineates contrasting emotions that require her to shuttle between 'holding on' and 'letting go'." While in "Kaya Mo Pa Ba", Asilo praised Magdangal's straightforward singing.

Commercial performance
Back to Love received a gold record certification from the Philippine Association of the Record Industry two weeks after its release in physical form.

Track listing

Personnel 
Adapted from the Back to Love liner notes.

 Malou N. Santos – executive producer
 Roxy Laquigan – executive producer
 Jonathan Manalo – a&r supervision, audio content head
 Roque "Rox" B. Santos – over-all album producer
 Jayson Sarmiento – promo specialist
 Jholina Luspo – promo associate
 London Angeles – promo coordinator
 Marivic Benedicto – star songs inc. and new media head
 Regie Sandel – sales & distribution
 Beth Faustino – music publishing officer
 Eaizen Almazan – new media technical assistant
 Abbey Aledo – music servicing officer
 Andrew Castillo – creative head
 BJ Pascual – photography
 Qurator – stylist
 Mickey See – make-up
 Jay Wee – hair
 Merlito Pabatao – art direction & design

Certification

References

2016 albums
Jolina Magdangal albums